Zhang Jian (born 1965/66) is a Chinese football administrator and a member of the FIFA Council since 2017.

He is the Chinese Football Association executive vice chairman and secretary general.

In May 2017, he was elected to the FIFA Council, and will serve until 2019.

References

1960s births
FIFA officials
Living people
Chinese sports executives and administrators
Year of birth missing (living people)
Place of birth missing (living people)